The 2009 Cleveland mayoral election took place on November 3, 2009, to elect the Mayor of Cleveland, Ohio. The election was officially nonpartisan, with the top two candidates from the September 8 primary advancing to the general election, regardless of party.

Candidates
 Kimberly F. Brown, former radio broadcaster
 Laverne Jones Gore, marketing consultant (Democrat)
 Frank G. Jackson, incumbent Mayor of Cleveland (Democrat)
 Robert M. Kilo, businessman
 Bill Patmon, former Cleveland City Councilman (Democrat)

Primary election

General election

References

2000s in Cleveland
Cleveland mayoral
Cleveland
Mayoral elections in Cleveland
Non-partisan elections